Last of the Warrens is a 1936 American Western film directed by Robert N. Bradbury.

Cast 
Bob Steele as Ted Warren
Margaret Marquis as Mary Burns
Charles King as Kent, aka Shelby
Horace Murphy as Grizzly
Lafe McKee as Sheriff Bates
Charles K. French as Bruce Warren
Blackie Whiteford as Slippery Gerns
Steve Clark as Henchman Spike

See also
Bob Steele filmography

External links 

1936 films
American black-and-white films
1936 Western (genre) films
American Western (genre) films
Films directed by Robert N. Bradbury
1930s English-language films
1930s American films